A festival is a celebratory event, usually centered on a theme.

Festival may also refer to:

Arts and entertainment

Film
Festival (1967 film), a documentary about the 1963-1965 Newport Folk Festivals
Festival (1996 film), a film by South Korean director Im Kwon-taek
Festival (2001 film), a drama film by Swedish director Karl Johan Larsson
Festival (2005 film), a comedy about performers at the Edinburgh Festival Fringe
The Festival (film), a 2018 comedy film set at large UK music festival

Literature
Festivals (book), a 1973 collection of festival-related folklore by Ruth Manning-Sanders
"The Festival" (short story), a story by H. P. Lovecraft

Music

Music companies
Festival Distribution, a Canadian record label and distributor
Festival Records (Australia) (1952–2005), an Australian music recording and publishing company
Festival Records, a record label founded in 1958 by Herb Abramson

Albums
Festival (Jon Oliva's Pain album) or the title song, 2006
Festival (Kenan Doğulu album), 2006
Festival (Lee Ritenour album), 1988
Festival (Santana album), 1977

Songs
"Festival", a song by Krokus from To You All

Television
Festival (TV channel), a defunct family-friendly HBO premium channel
Festival (British TV series), a 1960s dramatic anthology series
Festival (Canadian TV series), a 1960s entertainment anthology series

Other arts and entertainment
The Festival, an 18th-century masque
DDR Festival Dance Dance Revolution, a 2004 Dance Dance Revolution video game

Other uses
Aerostar R40S Festival, a Romanian light-sport aircraft
 Christian festival,  a major event in the Liturgical year of Christian churches, such as Christmas and Easter
Festival (Anglicanism), a type of observance day
Festival (food), a type of deep-fried bread in Jamaican cuisine
Festival Speech Synthesis System, a general multi-lingual speech synthesis system

See also
List of festivals
, an Empire F type coaster in service with F T Everard & Sons Ltd, 1946-61